The 1991 Overseas Final was the eleventh running of the Overseas Final as part of the qualification for the 1991 Speedway World Championship Final to be held in Göteborg, Sweden. The 1991 Final was held at the Odsal Stadium in Bradford, England on 23 June and was the second last qualifying round for Commonwealth and American riders.

With the (temporary) ending of the Intercontinental Final, the Top 9 riders from the Overseas Final qualified for the new World Semi-final's.

1991 Overseas Final
23 June
 Bradford, Odsal Stadium
Qualification: Top 9 plus 1 reserve to the World Semi-final

References

See also
 Motorcycle Speedway

1991
World Individual
Overseas Final